The Archaeology Museum of Pasca is an archaeological museum located in Pasca, Colombia. It houses a great collection of Pre-Columbian objects and human remains, including Muisca mummies. It has a replica of the famous golden raft, Balsa Muisca, found near this town that represents the El Dorado rite. The museum hosts a piece of Muisca textile from Belén, Boyacá. The total collection numbers 2500 pieces. Apart from the Muisca artifacts, the museum hosts material from the Tairona, Calima, Quimbaya, Sinú, San Agustín and Tierradentro, among others.

It also has a botanic garden, with stuffed animals and a large insectarium. It was founded in 1969 by the Roman Catholic priest Jaime Hincapié Santamaría.

See also 

 Gold Museum, Bogotá
 Archaeology Museum, Sogamoso

References

External links 
 Precolumbian Golden Boat Famous golden figure based on El Dorado rite (housed in the Gold Museum at Bogotá, Colombia)

Archaeological sites in Colombia
Indigenous topics of the Andes
Pre-Columbian cultures
Archaeological museums in Colombia
Tourist attractions near Bogotá
Buildings and structures in Cundinamarca Department
Tourist attractions in Cundinamarca Department
Muisca
Pasca